María-Isabel Fernández de Soto (born 18 September 1950) is a former professional tennis player from Colombia.

Biography
Fernández, who is originally from Cali, took a tennis scholarship to the University of South Florida at the age of 19. After a year of college, she joined the international tennis circuit and became the first Colombian woman to play professionally. She made several WTA quarterfinals but was most successful on tour as a doubles player.

She represented Colombia in the 1972 Federation Cup and won five of her six singles matches.

Her two Grand Slam semifinals were both in doubles: the mixed doubles at the 1973 French Open with Jairo Velasco and women's doubles at the 1973 Wimbledon Championships with Fiorella Bonicelli.

Fernández won her first WTA title with Martina Navratilova at the 1974 Virginia Slims of Dallas. The following year, she won another title at the 1975 U.S. Clay Court Championships with Fiorella Bonicelli as her partner.

Since retiring, she has worked as a tennis coach, and she is now a tennis pro at the Sawmill club in New York.

WTA Tour finals

Doubles (2–1)

Notes

References

External links
 
 
 

1950 births
Living people
Colombian female tennis players
Sportspeople from Cali
Colombian expatriates in the United States
Tennis players at the 1967 Pan American Games
Pan American Games competitors for Colombia
South Florida Bulls women's tennis players